Ivana Miličević (born April 26, 1974) is a Bosnian Croat-American actress and model. She is best known for her starring roles in the Cinemax action drama series Banshee (2013–2016) and The CW science fiction drama series The 100 (2018–2020).

Miličević had roles in films such as Vanilla Sky (2001), Down with Love (2003), Love Actually (2003), Just like Heaven (2005), Casino Royale (2006), Running Scared (2006), What's Your Number? (2011), and Catfight (2016).

She guest starred in numerous television series, including Seinfeld (1997), Felicity (1998–1999), Buffy the Vampire Slayer (2002), Friends (2003), Charmed (2003),  One on One (2004), American Dad! (2006–2008), Ugly Betty (2007), Chuck (2008), Power, and Gotham (2016–2017).

Early life
Miličević was born in Sarajevo, SFR Yugoslavia (modern-day Bosnia and Herzegovina), to Bosnian Croat parents. She immigrated to the United States at the age of five and was raised in Detroit, Michigan. Miličević's younger brother is Tomo Miličević, who was previously the lead guitarist of the rock band Thirty Seconds to Mars. She also had a younger brother, Filip, who died in August 2016.

Miličević worked as a model while attending Athens High School in Troy, Michigan. She was also a dancer for the Troy Kids on the Block, a New Kids on the Block tribute group, before leaving Michigan. She became a naturalized citizen of the United States. In 1992, Miličević graduated from high school and moved to Los Angeles in pursuit of an acting career. She was a struggling stand-up comedian, trying to win over crowds with her stories of the modeling business.

Career
Miličević began acting after graduation, appearing in the 1998 thriller film Enemy of the State. She then had guest appearances in numerous television series, including Charmed, Seinfeld, Felicity, Nash Bridges, The Nanny (with former Bond girl Lois Chiles), Buzzkill, Buffy the Vampire Slayer, Yes, Dear, Chuck, House, Friends, and Hawaii Five-0. Her acting career included a regular role on the HBO comedy series The Mind of the Married Man. She was on the cover of Paper in 2002.

In 2006, she starred in the CBS comedy series Love Monkey and played the role of Valenka in the James Bond film Casino Royale. In 2007, she played Lena on Ugly Betty. In 2008, she starred in Witless Protection, and featured in guest appearances in House and Pushing Daisies. Miličević played the Soviet intelligence officer Dasha Fedorovich in Command & Conquer: Red Alert 3 and in Command & Conquer Red Alert 3: Uprising. From 8 to 29 January 2011, she starred alongside Maggie Lawson, Kurt Fuller, and Peter Mackenzie in the Red Dog Squadron production of Greedy by Karl Gajdusek at the El Centro Theatre in Hollywood.

In 2018, she joined the cast in the fifth season of the CW science fiction drama series The 100, recurring until its conclusion in 2020. Also in 2020, she had starring roles as Striga in the animated fantasy series Castlevania and as Arianna Demachi in the action drama series Strike Back: Vendetta.

Personal life
On April 14, 2018, Miličević gave birth to a son. Miličević and Paddy Hogan married on December 29, 2018.

Filmography

Film

Television

Video games

References

External links

1974 births
Living people
Actresses from Michigan
American film actresses
American television actresses
American video game actresses
American people of Bosnia and Herzegovina descent
Yugoslav emigrants to the United States
20th-century American actresses
21st-century American actresses
Naturalized citizens of the United States